Slippery Slope is a 2006 independent film directed by Sarah Schenck and starring Kelly Hutchinson

Plot 
In order to finance her documentary project, a feminist filmmaker directs adult films after being recruited by a mysterious porn director.

Cast 
 Kelly Hutchinson as Gillian Black
 Jim True-Frost as Hugh Winston
 Laila Robins as Michaela Stark
 Wes Ramsey as Martin Breedlove
 Dan Fogler as Crafty
 Leslie Lyles as Judy Black
 Jessica Leccia as Stacy

External links

2006 films
American independent films
American comedy films
Films about pornography
2000s English-language films
2000s American films